John Keys may refer to:

John Caius (1510–1573), English physician and second founder of the present Gonville and Caius College, Cambridge
John Keys (organist) (born 1956), British organist
John W. Keys (1941–2008), Commissioner of the United States Bureau of Reclamation

See also
Johnnie Keyes (1940–2018), American pornographic actor
John Key (disambiguation)